Lower Potamus, Potamus Hypenerthen or Potamos Hypenerthen, was a deme of ancient Attica. It lay on the east coast north of Thoricus, and was once a populous place: it was celebrated as containing the sepulchre of Ion.

Lower Potamus is tentatively located at Panepistemioupolis.

References

Populated places in ancient Attica
Former populated places in Greece
Demoi